Saša Jovanović (born 12 January 1988) is a Serbian football forward who plays for Mosta.

References

External links
 

1988 births
Living people
Association football forwards
Serbian footballers
FK Metalac Gornji Milanovac players
FK Teleoptik players
Serbian SuperLiga players
FK Jedinstvo Bijelo Polje players
OFK Bar players
FK Jezero players
Montenegrin First League players
Serbian expatriate footballers
Expatriate footballers in Malta
Serbian expatriate sportspeople in Malta
Mosta F.C. players